Zvolen–Karpina–Šahy–Čata railway  is a railway line in Slovakia.

History 
Railway between Csata and Balassagyarmat was built in 1891 by a former subsidiary of MÁV, called Garam–Ipolyvölgyi MÁV-HÉV. It reached Ipeľ at Homok (today part of Šahy). There was built a new branch line in 1898-199 between Ipolyság and Korpona. As the newly founded Czechoslovakia needed the railway line, the border with Hungary was moved to the left bank of Ipel instead of the Ipel at all.

Czechoslovakia extended the branch line in 1923-1925 up to Zvolen. There are tunnels as well in the new part of the line.

Because of defending reasons part in Hungary was demolished in 1963. It was a 6.3 km long part between Drégelypalánk and the border.

In 2003 passenger transport between Šahy  and Čata was cancelled and then restarted in 2019

Images

References

External links 

 A vasútvonal adatai – Vlaky.net 
 Az állomások képei – Vasútállomások.hu
 Alagutak a vonalon 

Railway lines in Slovakia
Railway lines opened in 1891